Skybound Entertainment is an American multiplatform entertainment company founded by Robert Kirkman and David Alpert.

History
Skybound Entertainment is the company behind the long-running comic, The Walking Dead, created by Robert Kirkman. Since the company’s founding in 2010, Skybound has developed properties in traditional and new media, including comics, gaming, television, film, and digital media series. The company has since launched into the virtual reality space, and in 2017, created an in-house digital studio for online content.

Subsidiaries
In 2016, Skybound Entertainment expanded internationally with the opening of Skybound North in Vancouver, led by former Lucasfilm Animation executive Catherine Winder.

In 2018, Skybound created Skybound Games to develop video games based on its intellectual property, and Skybound Stories, a joint venture with Sky Group.

Comics 

In addition to the Eisner Award-winning comic book series, The Walking Dead, Kirkman’s other titles include long-running superhero comic Invincible, Outcast, Super Dinosaur, Oblivion Song and Fire Power.

With a creator-owned driven platform, Skybound has also created other popular comic book titles that include fantasy adventure comic Birthright, by Josh Williamson, and the historical fiction comic, Manifest Destiny by Chris Dingess.

In 2017, Skybound released the revenge comic, Extremity, by creator Daniel Warren Johnson, and their first vampire horror comic, Redneck, by Donny Cates. Kill the Minotaur by writers Christian Cantamessa and Chris Pasetto, and artist Lukas Ketner is set to hit comic shops on June 14, 2017. Recently, they have also started "Skyward" from the writer of the TV show Lucifer. In April 2021, it was announced a five issue miniseries called Skybound X would launch to celebrate 10 years of Skybound, with the book featuring different stories per issue, with one story being Rick Grimes: 2000 by Kirkman and Ryan Ottley.

Skybound Comet 
In 2021, it was announced that Skybound would start a new line entitled Skybound Comet, with graphic novels meant for YA and Middle Grade readers. The first of these books include Clementine: Book One by Tillie Walden in July 2022, Everyday Hero Machine Boy by Tri Vuong and Irma Kniivila in September 2022, and Sea Serpent's Heir Book One by Mairghread Scott and Pablo Tunica in October 2022.

Television and film 
After Alpert and Kirkman's success with AMC’s The Walking Dead, the duo announced their second television adaptation for Kirkman's comic, Outcast.  This was announced in June 2014 and received a series pickup on Cinemax.[2] Outcast centers on protagonist, Kyle Barnes, played by Patrick Fugit, fighting a demon that has plagued his small Virginia town for decades. The series lineup includes Philip Glenister, Brent Spiner, Reg E. Cathey, and Wrenn Schmidt. The first season of Outcast premiered on June 3, 2016 and was renewed for a second season.

Skybound partnered with Viki to develop Korean pre-apocalyptic drama Five Year. The series will be shot in Korea as a K-drama with a local cast and crew, and the parties plan to distribute the first 16-episode season on Korean television. The series, based on an original story by Kirkman, centers on a family facing an impending apocalypse within the next five years. In 2017, Skybound announced a partnership with 360 Powwow to produce Five Year in various Latin American markets.

Skybound produced Robert Kirkman’s Secret History of Comics. This six-part docuseries explores a wide range of topics from the history and world of comic books and premiered on AMC on November 12, 2017.

In 2017 it was announced that a film based on Kirkman's second longest running comic Invincible was being developed by Universal Pictures, with Seth Rogen and Evan Goldberg set to write/direct/produce the film with Kirkman serving as an executive producer. In 2018 it was announced that an animated series also based on Invincible was being developed for Amazon Prime Video featuring Steven Yeun as Invincible and J.K. Simmons as Omni-Man. The series was released on March 26, 2021 to general acclaim and has been renewed by Amazon for a second and third seasons. The series is also created and executive produced by Kirkman, who wrote the pilot and the season finale, with Simon Racioppa, David Alpert, Catherine Winder, Seth Rogen and Evan Goldberg serving as co-executive producers. The company's other film projects include the feature film AIR, starring The Walking Dead’s Norman Reedus and Academy Award-nominated actor Djimon Hounsou. That same year, it was announced that Spin Master Entertainment and Atomic Cartoons would make an animated television series based on Super Dinosaur, a comic that Kirkman created alongside Jason Howard in 2011. The show launched in 2018.

In 2019, Universal Pictures announced the development of Renfield, a horror-comedy film about the character of the same name based on a pitch by Robert Kirkman, with Chris McKay set to direct. The film will also be produced by McKay, Kirkman, David Alpert, Bryan Furst, and Sean Furst in a joint-venture between Skybound and Universal. The film is set to release April 14, 2023.

Digital 

In 2015, Skybound released the first-ever narrative virtual reality series, Gone, for Samsung's Milk VR platform. Gone surrounds the disappearance of a young girl from a playground, and the family's journey in learning what happened. The series was filmed in 360 degrees and includes shifting perspectives with "hotspots." "Hotspots" are used as clues, offering a fully immersive experience. Gone was directed by J.T. Petty

As of 2016, Skybound is set to produce a horror VR series, Lies Within, the first project out of Skybound’s partnership with interactive theatrical company Delusion. 

In 2017, Skybound opened an in-house studio to create and expand original digital content. Since the opening of the space, Skybound developed a Live.me series focusing on diversity in TV and media hosted by Yvette Nicole Brown. Other original content filmed in the studio include the weekly series Skybound’s Happy Hour. Happy Hour features special guests every week to create The Walking Dead inspired cocktails. Former guests have included Ross Marquand and Michael Traynor.

Skybound Games 

In April 2018, Skybound announced the formation of Skybound Games, a publishing division focused on indie games, while also forming a mobile division Howyaknow, LLC. Coinciding with the announcement, the company also signed publishing deals for console versions of the games Slime Rancher and The Long Dark.

In October 2018, due to the collapse of Telltale Games, Skybound Games announced they would be working on finishing up the final two episodes of The Walking Dead: The Final Season, "Broken Toys" and "Take Us Back", to end the game adaption of their series. In addition to continued digital release, Skybound Games also released physical editions of the game for PlayStation 4, Xbox One, and Nintendo Switch. 

In February 2019, Skybound Games announced plans to release the remastered versions of six classic Dungeon & Dragons games: Baldur's Gate, Baldur's Gate II, Baldur's Gate: Siege of Dragonspear, Icewind Dale, Planescape: Torment, and Neverwinter Nights, developed for modern computers by Beamdog, as console versions (both as retail and digital) later in the year. In 2020, Skybound Entertainment raised a new round of funding from the gaming company Com2uS Studios. The two companies signed a deal to develop a The Walking Dead mobile game.

License and merchandise 
Skybound's party game, Superfight, kickstarted in 2013. Superfight is a game where players battle made up superheroes against each other, in ridiculous, and often heated, hypothetical arguments. In 2014 Darin Ross partnered with Skybound to publish the game. Superfight has 19 expansion packs to date.

In 2017, Skybound signed a deal with Druid City Games for release of its game The Grimm Forest, which raised over $400,000 on Kickstarter.

Titles
 The Astounding Wolf-Man
 Battle Pope
 Before Your Eyes
 Birthright (comic book)
 Brit
 Clone
 Dark Ride
 Dead Body Road
 Demonic (from Pilot Season)
 Die!Die!Die!
 Extremity
 Fire Power 
 Ghosted
 Gone
 Guarding the Globe
 Green Valley
 Hardcore (from Pilot Season)
 Heroes and Villains: The History of Comics
 Horizon
 The Infinite
 Invincible
 Invincible Universe
 Kill the Minotaur
 Kim-Joy's Magic Bakery
 Kroma
 Lies Within
 Manifest Destiny
 Oblivion Song
 Outcast
Oxenfree
The Outer Darkness
 Redneck
 Science Dog
 Skybound X
 Skyward
 Stellar (from Pilot Season)
 Stillwater
 Super Dinosaur
 Tech Jacket
 Thief of Thieves
 Ultramega
 The Walking Dead (comic)
 Witch Doctor

Film and television 
 Air
 Fear the Walking Dead
 Invincible
 Outcast
 Renfield
 Scare PewDiePie
 Super Dinosaur
 Tales of the Walking Dead
 The Walking Dead
 The Walking Dead: World Beyond

References

External links

 
Image Comics imprints
Companies based in Beverly Hills, California
Entertainment companies based in California
Book publishing companies based in California
American companies established in 2010
Publishing companies established in 2010
Entertainment companies established in 2010
2010 establishments in California
Video game companies established in 2018
Video game companies of the United States
Video game publishers